Lively may refer to:

Places
 Lively, Missouri, United States, an unincorporated community 
 Lively, Texas, an unincorporated community
 Lively, Virginia, United States, an unincorporated community 
 Lively, West Virginia, United States, an unincorporated community
 Lively, Ontario, Canada
 Lively Island, Falkland Islands
 Lively Point, Renaud Island, Antarctica

Ships
 HMS Lively, the name of several ships of the Royal Navy
 Lively-class frigate, a Royal Navy class of sailing ship
 , a tug renamed Lively in 1918
 Lively (HBC vessel), operated by the HBC from 1822-1824, see Hudson's Bay Company vessels

Technology
 Lively (company), a connected health technology company
 Google Lively, a web-based virtual environment
 Lively Kernel, an open source web programming environment

Other uses
 Lively (surname), a list of people
 Lively (album), an album by American band Arrogance
 Lively Technical Center, a public technical training school in Tallahassee, Florida